Australian athletes have established non-for-profit foundations to assist a range of causes including sporting opportunities, medical research, social disadvantage, disability and indigenous development. Several foundations have been established as a result of family members suffering certain medical conditions. It is argued that these athletes are giving back to the community and are good role models. Some of the foundations have closed due to difficulties in fund raising  and accountability issues in financial management.

List of Charities

List of charities established by Australian athletes or in honour of them.

References

External links
Australian Charities and Not-for-profits Commission - includes a database of charities on its register

Charities based in Australia
Charities
charities
Sports charities